Casper's Ice Cream is a family owned ice cream company based in Richmond, Utah. The company's most popular product is the FatBoy.

History
Casper's Ice Cream was established in 1925 by Casper Merrill who made the first ice cream sundae on a stickbars with the milk and cream of his family's milk, and these bars were the original Ice Cream Nut Sundae on a Stick which he named it as the Casco Nut Sundaes. The first bars that are known today as the Fatboy Nut Sundaes were made with 10 gallon milk can. Merrill sold these ice cream bars on a 4th of July event and he then made the first Fatboy brand sandwich which was much larger than the usual ice cream novelty. The company is currently owned by Merrill's grandsons. Casper's Ice Cream is a member of the Utah Food Council's Utah's Own's program which was established in 2001 with the purpose of supporting and promoting local products.

Products

Casper's Ice Cream's original ingredients have changed very little throughout the years. There are more than 360,000 ice cream bars sandwiches that are produced daily, which can be found in major national retailers. The brands are FatBoys, Casper's Classics, and the Active D'Lites. The Active D'Lites are ice cream bars featuring pre and probiotics with only 110 to 140 calories depending on the flavor which are coated with fine European style chocolate. The Casper's Classics were first created to compete the super premium novelty products which are bars coated with Guittard chocolate. The most popular product is the FatBoy which is a thick, creamy ice cream sandwich offered in flavors of vanilla, chocolate, strawberry, raspberry, cookies and cream, mint chocolate chip and peppermint.

References

External links
Utah's Own
Casper's Ice Cream
Casper's Ice Cream: A Delicious History Part 1
Casper's Ice Cream: A Delicious History Part 2

Food and drink companies based in Utah
Ice cream brands
Ice cream parlors in the United States
1925 establishments in Utah